Conor Mullen (born 1966) is an Irish actor who played Frank in Smother, Stuart McElroy in Holby City and Aidan Doherty in the 2007 BBC1 drama series Rough Diamond. He was born in Dublin. Both his parents were pharmacists, and he is one of a family of six. He grew up on the north side of Dublin in Sutton/Howth on the coast

In addition to acting, Mullen is also a voice-over artist, voicing many advertisements that are heard on Irish radio. He also provides the voice of the speaking clock in Ireland.

Career
He began acting after he signed up for drama classes at the Brendan Smith Academy in Dublin and shortly after that, headed to New York, to study acting at The Neighbourhood Playhouse for two years.
In 2007, Mullen began playing the role of Chrissie Williams' abusive boyfriend Stuart McElroy in the BBC medical drama Holby City. 
Mullen left Holby City in 2008 as his character was arrested and taken away by the police.

Personal life
Mullen is the first cousin of Larry Mullen, Jr. who is the drummer of Irish rock group, U2. He is married to actress Fiona Bell; they met on the set of Soldier Soldier in 1997. He has four children Hannah, Georgia, Cassie and Keir.

Television roles
 Smother (2020) Frank
 The Drowning (2020) Mr. McKenzie
 Warrior (2020) Elijah Rooker
 Red Rock (2016-2020) Supt Kevin Dunne 
 Rig 45 (2018) Ville
 Sacrifice (2017) Stephen Renney
 Raw (2010-2011) Larry Dean 
 Single Handed (2010) Jim Dooley 

Deception- (Irish TV series) (2013)- Jack French
 The Silence (2010) Paul Begley
 Swansong: Story of Occi Byrne (2009) Brother Cornelius
 Silent Witness (2008)  D I Michael McKenzie
 Holby City (2007–2008)  Stuart McElroy
 School Run (2008)  David Brennan
 The Whistleblowers (2007)  Thomas Breitner
 Anner House (2007)  Nicky Nolan
 Rough Diamond (2007)  Aidan Doherty
 The Tiger's Tail (2006)  MC
 Proof (2005)  J.P O'Farrell
 Murder Prevention (2004)  DCI Patrick Goddard
 Island at War (2004) Leuatnant Walker
 Ultimate Force (2003) Donald "Omega" Clissmann 
 The Honeymooners (2003) Peter
 Heartbeat (2002) Kieron Doyle
 Puckoon (2002) Shamus
 Helen West (2002) Chief Supt Bailey
 Armadillo (2001) Bram
 Silent Grace (2001) Cunningham
 North Square (2000) Gary Booth
 Saltwater (2000) Ray
 Badger (2000) Ralph Allen
 Ordinary Decent Criminal McHale
 Shergar (1999) Hennity
 Blessed Fruit (1999)
 Reckless: The Movie (1998) John McGinley
 The Bill (1998) Friar Colley
 Soldier Soldier (1997) CSM Alan FitZpatrick
 Reckless (1997) John McGinley
 Father Ted (1996) Award Ceremony Priest
 Chef! (1996) First Couple
 Space Truckers (1996) Cop #1
 Giving Tongue (1996) Journalist
 Boys and Men (1996)
 Life After Life (1995) Andrew Martin
 Ailsa (1994) Emperor
 The Apiarist's Dream of World Domination (1992)
 Dick Francis: Twice Shy (1989) Liam Fitzgerald

Film roles
 Sacrifice (2016) Stephen Renney
 United Passions (2014) Ivo Schricker
 Patricks Day (2014) Dr Meyer
 Woodehouse in Exile (2013) as Paul Schmidt

References

External links 
 

Living people
1962 births
Irish male television actors
Irish male film actors
Male actors from Dublin (city)
Irish expatriates in England